Alice Segers Whittemore is an American epidemiologist and biostatistician who studies the effects of genetics and lifestyle on cancer, after an earlier career as a pure mathematician studying group theory. She works as a professor of health research and policy and of biomedical data science at Stanford University, and has served as president of the International Biometric Society.

Education and career
Whittemore originally studied pure mathematics.
Her bachelor's degree is from Marymount Manhattan College,
and she completed a Ph.D. in 1967 from the City University of New York with a dissertation on Frattini subgroups supervised by Gilbert Baumslag.

As a professor of mathematics at Hunter College, she became interested in epidemiology and statistics, and took a fellowship to New York University to accomplish that shift of interests, under the mentorship of Joseph Keller. Keller and Whittemore married and moved together to Stanford in 1978. There Whittemore became a professor in the Department of Health Research and Policy. She was chief of epidemiology there from 1997 to 2001, and later became co-chair of the department. Keller died in 2016.

Contributions
One of Whittemore's studies found a link between fertility drugs and ovarian cancer, especially strong among women who were treated with the drugs but failed to conceive.

Awards and honors
In 1992, Whittemore was elected as a fellow of the American Association for the Advancement of Science. She is also a fellow of the American Statistical Association, and a member of the National Academy of Medicine.

In 2004, she won the Janet L. Norwood Award for outstanding achievement by a woman in the statistical sciences. In 2010, the  Statistics in Epidemiology section of the American Statistical Association gave her their Nathan Mantel Lifetime Achievement Award.
She was the recipient of the Committee of Presidents of Statistical Societies 
Florence Nightingale David Award in 2005 and
R. A. Fisher Lectureship in 2016 "for her fundamental contributions to biostatistics and epidemiology, covering a wide range of topics from environmental risk assessment to genetic linkage analysis, genetic association studies and cancer epidemiology; for bringing her statistical and mathematical insight to bear on the collection and interpretation of scientific data; for her leadership in large consortia of cancer studies; and for being a role model for many young scientists".

Selected publications

.
.
.
.
.

References

External links
Home page
"Alice S. Whittemore: An Oral History," Stanford Historical Society Oral History Program, 2015.

Year of birth missing (living people)
Living people
American women epidemiologists
American epidemiologists
20th-century American mathematicians
American statisticians
Women mathematicians
Women statisticians
Group theorists
Marymount Manhattan College alumni
City University of New York alumni
Hunter College faculty
Stanford University faculty
Fellows of the American Association for the Advancement of Science
Fellows of the American Statistical Association
Members of the National Academy of Medicine
21st-century American mathematicians
20th-century American women
21st-century American women